Bryce Hudson (March 29, 1979, Rabat, Morocco) is a Moroccan-American Neo-plasticist (De Stijl) painter. Hudson's early geometric paintings explore race and stereotypes through means of the Geometric abstraction style. Later in his  career, influenced by the theories of Constructivism the paintings and wall sculptures referenced abstracted architectural and spatial elements. His printmaking combines movements in art history such as Minimalism and Rococo.

Along with contemporaries Pierre Clerk and Ilya Bolotowsky, Hudson works within a small set of artist working within the Neo-Plastic style - not adhering to strict rules, but exploring the depth and future of geometric abstract art.

Life
Bryce Hudson was born in Rabat, Morocco and adopted into an American family as an infant. He studied painting, psychology, and sculpture at Kent State University School of Fine Art. In a 1999 exhibit at the Speed Museum, he explored mixed-race and psychological influences of race and identity in contemporary society.

Notable exhibits, awards, and medals
 1999 – Beyond The Walls - Speed Art Museum, Louisville KY.
 2006 – Contemporary Geometric Abstraction - Mason Muir Fine Art, Atlanta, Georgia
 2007 – Finding Family - 21c Museum Hotel, Louisville, KY
 2008 – Neue Perspektiven in der Malerei (New Perspectives in Painting) - Tsinghua University, Beijing, China
 2010 – Embracing Ambiguities – California State University, Fullerton, California
 2011 – Art Taipei – Taipei, Taiwan
 2012 – Thomas More College – Cincinnati, Ohio
 2012 – Koru Contemporary – Hong Kong, HK
 2012 – East African Art Biennale – Dar es Salaam, Tanzania, Africa
 2014 – Art Miami – The Duane Reed Gallery
 2015 – Koru Contemporary Art Center – Hong Kong, HK

References

Further reading

20th-century American painters
American male painters
21st-century American painters
American printmakers
American muralists
1979 births
Moroccan emigrants to the United States
People from Rabat
Living people
Minimalist artists
African-American contemporary artists
American contemporary artists
American contemporary painters
Artists from Louisville, Kentucky
Painters from Kentucky
African-American printmakers
20th-century African-American painters
21st-century African-American artists
20th-century American male artists